The first Commonwealth Korfball Championships were held in Croydon from 14 to 16 July 2006.

This was a tournament recognised by the International Korfball Federation, and hosted by the British Korfball Association, at the Whitgift School, Croydon.

Participants came from Australia, England, Scotland, South Africa and Wales.  Additionally teams from Ireland and North America (USA and Canada) were invited to take part, to help the development of korfball in these countries.

The tournament was by way of a round-robin championships, with England the eventual winners.

References

External links
 British Korfball Association

Korfball
Korfball competitions